Broken Hearts of Hollywood is a 1926 American silent comedy drama film released by Warner Bros. and directed by Lloyd Bacon. It is unknown, but the film might have been released with a Vitaphone soundtrack. A print of the film exists.

Plot
Virginia Perry leaves her husband and child to return to Hollywood; but having dissipated her beauty and seeking solace in drink, she soon finds herself another "has been" on the fringe of movie circles. Her daughter, Betty Anne, wins a national beauty contest, and en route to Hollywood she meets Hal, another contest winner; both fail in their first screen attempts and turn to Marshall, an unscrupulous trickster, who enrolls them in his acting school. Molly, a movie extra, induces Betty Anne to attend a wild party; she is arrested in a raid; and Hal, to raise the money for her bail, takes a "stunt" job in which he is badly hurt. Betty Anne seeks the aid of star actor McLain, who obtains for her the leading female role in his next film; Virginia, who is cast as her mother, keeps silent about their relationship until the film is completed. Apprehensive for her daughter's safety, she shoots Marshall while in a drunken stupor and is arrested. At the trial, Betty Anne's testimony saves her mother, who is then happily united with her daughter and Hal.

Cast

Patsy Ruth Miller as Betty Anne Bolton
Louise Dresser as Virginia Perry
Douglas Fairbanks Jr. as Hal Terwilliger
Jerry Miley as Marshall
Stuart Holmes as McLain
Barbara Worth as Molly
Dick Sutherland as the Sheriff
Emile Chautard as the Director
Anders Randolf as the District Attorney
George Nichols as the Chief of Detectives
Sam de Grasse as the Defense Attorney
Dolores Corrigan as Betty Anne Bolton as a Child (uncredited)

See also
 List of early Warner Bros. talking features

Preservation
A print of Broken Hearts of Hollywood is preserved in the George Eastman House and Filmmuseum Amsterdam.

References
Notes

External links

1926 films
American silent feature films
Films directed by Lloyd Bacon
American black-and-white films
1920s English-language films
1926 comedy-drama films
1920s American films
Silent American comedy-drama films